Agar Panchaitan is a town located in the state of Maharashtra, on the west coast of India. It is located approximately 60 miles south of Mumbai.

Cities and towns in Raigad district